Miss Prissy is a character in Looney Tunes.

Miss Prissy may also refer to:

 Miss Prissy (dancer), a dancer who starred in the 2005 documentary Rize
 Miss Prissy Diamond, a character in 1859 novel The Minister's Wooing by Harriet Beecher Stowe
 Miss Prissy, or Priscilla Tomboy, primary role in the 1767 English comic opera The Romp
 "Miss Prissy", a song by Lambchop from Tools in the Dryer

See also
"Little Miss Prissy", a song by the Stay Cats from Gonna Ball